Gilbert Holiday (29 January 1879 – 8 January 1937) was a British painter. His work was part of the painting event in the art competition at the 1932 Summer Olympics.

References

1879 births
1937 deaths
20th-century British painters
British male painters
Olympic competitors in art competitions
People from London
19th-century British male artists
20th-century British male artists